A drive-in theater or drive-in cinema is a form of cinema structure consisting of a large outdoor movie screen, a projection booth, a concession stand, and a large parking area for automobiles. Within this enclosed area, customers can view movies from the privacy and comfort of their cars. Some drive-ins have small playgrounds for children and a few picnic tables or benches.

The screen can be as simple as a painted white wall, or it can be a steel truss structure with a complex finish. Originally, the movie's sound was provided by speakers on the screen and later by individual speakers hung from the window of each car, which was attached to a small pole by a wire. These speaker systems were superseded by the more practical method of microbroadcasting the soundtrack to car radios. This also has the advantage of the film soundtrack to be heard in stereo on car stereo systems, which are typically of much higher quality and fidelity than the basic small mono speakers used in the old systems.

History

Early drive-ins (before WWII) 
A partial drive-in theater—Theatre de Guadalupe—was opened in Las Cruces, New Mexico on April 23, 1915:
Seven hundred people may be comfortably seated in the auditorium. Automobile entrances and places for 40 or more cars within the theater grounds and in-line position to see the pictures and witness all performances on the stage is a feature of the place that will please car owners.

The first movie shown by the Theatre de Guadalupe was Bags of Gold, produced by Siegmund Lubin. Theatre de Guadalupe was soon renamed De Lux Theater before closing in July 1916.

In 1921, a drive-in was opened by Claude V. Caver in Comanche, Texas. Caver obtained a permit from the city to project films downtown. With cars parked bumper-to-bumper, patrons witnessed the screening of silent films from their vehicles. In the 1920s, "outdoor movies" became a popular summer entertainment, but relatively few "drive-in" experiments were made due to logistical difficulties.

The drive-in theater was patented in Camden, New Jersey by chemical company magnate Richard M. Hollingshead, Jr., whose family owned and operated the R.M. Hollingshead Corporation chemical plant in Camden. In 1932, Hollingshead conducted outdoor theater tests in his driveway at 212 Thomas Avenue in Riverton. After nailing a screen to trees in his backyard, he set a 1928 Kodak projector on the hood of his car and put a radio behind the screen, testing different sound levels with his car windows down and up. Blocks under vehicles in the driveway enabled him to determine the size and spacing of ramps so all automobiles could view the screen. Hollingshead applied for a patent of his invention on August 6, 1932, and he was given  on May 16, 1933.

Hollingshead's drive-in opened in New Jersey June 6, 1933, on Admiral Wilson Boulevard in Pennsauken Township, a short distance from Cooper River Park where the first commercial airport to serve Philadelphia was located – Central Airport. Rosemont Avenue now runs through where the theater was and is currently the site of Zinman Furs.  It offered 400 slots and a  screen. He advertised his drive-in theater with the slogan, "The whole family is welcome, regardless of how noisy the children are." The first film shown was the Adolphe Menjou film Wives Beware. Failing to make a profit, Hollingshead sold the theater after three years to a Union, New Jersey, theater owner who moved the infrastructure to that city, but the concept caught on nationwide.

The April 15, 1934, opening of Shankweiler's Auto Park in Orefield, Pennsylvania, was followed by Galveston's Drive-In Short Reel Theater (July 5, 1934), the Pico Drive-In Theater at Pico and Westwood boulevards in Los Angeles (September 9, 1934) and the Weymouth Drive-In Theatre in Weymouth, Massachusetts (May 6, 1936). In 1937, three more opened in Ohio, Massachusetts and Rhode Island, with another 12 during 1938 and 1939 in California, Florida, Maine, Maryland, Massachusetts, Michigan, New York, Texas and Virginia.

Early drive-in theaters had to deal with sound issues. The original Hollingshead drive-in had speakers installed on the tower itself, which caused a sound delay affecting patrons at the rear of the drive-in's field.  In 1935, the Pico Drive-in Theater attempted to solve this problem by having a row of speakers in front of the cars. In 1941, RCA introduced in-car speakers with individual volume controls which solved the noise pollution issue and provided satisfactory sound to drive-in patrons. Just before World War II, 9 of the 15 drive-in movie theaters open in the United States were operated by Philip Smith, who promoted a family-friendly environment by allowing children to enter free and built playgrounds.

Peak (late 1940s–1960s) 

After 1945, rising car ownership and suburban and rural population led to a boom in drive-in theaters, with hundreds being opened each year. More couples were reunited and having children, resulting in the Baby Boom, and more cars were being purchased following the end of wartime fuel rationing. By 1951, the number of drive-in movie theaters in the United States had increased from its 1947 total of 155 to 4,151.

The drive-in's peak popularity came in the late 1950s and early 1960s, particularly in rural areas, with over 4,000 drive-ins spread across the United States in 1958. They were a cheaper alternative to in-door cinema theaters because not only did they save the gas of driving out to the city and then back home, but the cost of building and maintaining a drive-in theater was cheaper than that of an indoor theater, resulting in the lower overall cost of attendance. Among its advantages was the fact that older adults with children could take care of their infant while watching a movie. At the same time, youth found drive-ins ideal for a first date. Unlike indoor cinema theaters, there was an air of informality that was appealing to people of all ages, but specifically to families. The drive-in's success was rooted in its reputation of being a family-friendly place. Parents were able to bring their children to the theater, often in pajamas, without worrying about bothering other movie-goers and were also able to spend time together without paying the expenses of babysitters. Drive-ins catered to their known audience, offering luxuries such as bottle warmers and diaper vending machines, and later miniature golf courses, swimming pools, and even motels on the land with windows facing the screens so that viewers could watch the films from their beds. During the 1950s, the greater privacy afforded to patrons gave drive-ins a reputation as immoral, and they were labeled "passion pits" in the media. The 1978 movie Grease portrays the local drive-in as a preferred spot for trysts. This indicates that the drive-in theater experience was a part of North American pop culture during this time, coupled with people's love for cars and movies. It was also popular among young people to meet up and have sex, smoke marijuana and drink alcohol. It was appealing to young people as it allowed them to express freedom and liberty they would otherwise lack at home.

At their height, some drive-ins used attention-grabbing gimmicks to boost attendance. They ranged from drawings for prizes and free admission, small airplane runways,  helicopter or hot air balloon rides, unusual attractions such as a small petting zoo or cage of monkeys, personal appearances by actors to open their movies, or musical groups to play before the show. Some drive-ins held Sunday religious services or charged a flat price per car on slow nights like Wednesdays or Sundays. On "buck" or "bargain" nights during the 1950s and 1960s, the admission price was one dollar per car; during the 1970s and '80s, bargain night admission was generally five dollars.

As revenue was more limited than regular theaters since showings could only begin at twilight, there were abortive attempts to create suitable conditions for daylight viewing, such as large tent structures, but nothing viable was developed.

One of the largest drive-in theaters was the Johnny All-Weather Drive-In in Copiague, New York. Covering over 29 acres, it could park 2,500 vehicles. It had a full-service restaurant with seating on the roof and a trolley system to take children and adults to a playground and a large indoor theater for bad weather or for those who wanted to watch in air-conditioned comfort.

Decline (1970s–1990s) 
Several factors contributed to the decline of the drive-in movie industry. Beginning in the late 1960s, drive-in attendance began to decline as the result of improvements and changes to home entertainment, from color television and cable TV to  VCRs and video rental in the early 1980s. Additionally, the 1970s energy crisis led to the widespread adoption of daylight saving time (which caused drive-in movies to start an hour later) and lower use of automobiles, making it increasingly difficult for drive-ins to remain profitable.

Mainly following the advent of cable television and video cassette recorder (VCR), then with the arrival of DVD and streaming systems, families were able to enjoy movies in the comfort of their homes. The new entertainment technology increased the options and the movie watching experience.

While exploitation films had been a drive-in staple since the 1950s, helped by relatively limited oversight compared to downtown theaters, by the 1970s, several venues switched from showing family-friendly fare to R-rated and X-rated films as a way to offset declining patronage and revenue, while other venues that still catered to families, began to show R-rated or pornographic movies in late-night time slots to bring in extra income.  This allowed censored materials to be viewed by a wider audience, including those for whom viewing was still illegal in some states, and it was also reliant upon varying local ordinances controlling such material. It also required a relatively remote location away from the heavier populated areas of towns and cities.

Overall, drive-in theaters were getting mainly B movies or low-rated films from the movie industry. What is more, while movie rental fees were increasing, the film industry was also expecting drive-in theaters to maintain prolonged time to run the shows. A combination of these factors was creating difficulties for the drive-ins to compete with the growing indoor cinemas.

The runaway inflation and real estate interest rate hikes in the late 1970s and early 1980s made the large land tracts used by drive-ins increasingly expensive and thus far too valuable for continued use as drive-ins. Many Drive-ins operated solely on weekends, while some were open only during the spring and summer months; they were also subject to the whim of nature, as adverse weather often resulted in poor attendance or cancellations. By the late 1980s, the total number of drive-ins still operating in the US and Canada fell to less than two hundred.

In addition to the large amount of space drive-in theaters occupy, many of the old ones also needed to invest to improve their infrastructure. Many of the owners were not willing to make further investment; growing land prices were also making it difficult to invest in and maintain the expense of a drive-in theater business. As many of the drive-in theaters were set up in the outskirts, with the expansion of towns maintaining big property was also becoming difficult and costly.

Many former drive-in movie sites remain, with several re-purposed as storage or flea market sites, often after residential housing or other higher-value uses came to rural or sparsely populated areas where the drive-ins were located. In Michigan, former drive-in properties have become industrial parks, shopping centers, indoor theaters, and even churches (as with the Former Woodland Drive-In in Grand Rapids, MI). In Philadelphia, the South City Drive-In became the location of the original Spectrum in the late 1960s, with a small portion of its old property line extending into what would become the (now-demolished) Veterans Stadium complex. (Today, that small portion, combined with the original Spectrum location, is part of Xfinity Live! Philadelphia). Another example of a drive in-turned-flea market is Spotlight 88 in North Sewickley Township, Beaver County, Pennsylvania, which ended business as a drive-in after an F3 tornado destroyed much of the property on May 31, 1985. As a joke, after the tornado hit, the owners put up the "now-showing" sign Gone with the Wind. It was most likely copied from a Taylor, Michigan Drive in called Ecorse Drive-In. On July 16, 1980, a freak derecho storm with 150 mph straight-line winds  swept the Drive-In away leaving only the "now-showing" sign with the letters "Now Playing Gone with the Wind". The screen was rebuilt, but the business never recovered; by 1989, it was sold and now is the site of a Kroger grocery store.

Revival and new drive-in formats (late 1990s–2000s) 

Beginning in the late 1970s and extending through the mid-1990s, those drive-ins still operating acquired a quasi-novelty status, catering to the wave of "boomer nostalgia" and loyal patrons. This "retro" appeal eventually led to a revival of sorts by the end of the 1990s.

This resurgence of the drive-in industry led to the inception of the "do-it-yourself" drive-in beginning in 2001, which used contemporary tools such as LCD projectors and micro radio transmitters. The first was the Liberation Drive-In in Oakland, California, which sought to reclaim under-used urban spaces such as vacant parking lots in the downtown area. The following years have had a rise of the "guerrilla drive-in" movement, in which groups of dedicated individuals orchestrate similar outdoor film and video screenings. Showings are often organized online, and participants meet at specified locations to watch films projected on bridge pillars or warehouses. The content featured at these screenings has frequently been independent or experimental films, cult movies, or otherwise alternative programming. Aside from Oakland's Liberation, the best-known "guerrilla" drive-ins include the Santa Cruz Guerilla Drive-In in Santa Cruz, California, North Bay Mobile Drive-In in Novato, California, MobMov in San Francisco, California and Hollywood, and more recently the Guerilla Drive-In Victoria in Victoria, British Columbia.

A similar, more recent concept is the "boutique" drive-in, which caters to a smaller audience, generally 30 to 50 vehicles (with some also offering seats in front of the screen). At the same time, food trucks are often used as concession stands. However, unlike the "guerrilla" format, this type of drive-in also generally presents mainstream fare, current releases, and popular classics. A key feature of this format is the focus on the "vintage" aesthetics of the drive-in.

Faced with the closure of Hull's Drive-In in Lexington, Virginia in 1999, the nonprofit group Hull's Angels formed to raise funds, buy the property, and operate the theater as a nonprofit venture specializing in family-friendly films. Hull's continues to be the nation's only nonprofit drive-in.

By 2006, around 500 drive-in theaters were open in the United States, counting regularly operating venues (about 400) and those that held showings sporadically, usually during summertime, the highest number since the mid-1970s. The industry also rebounded in Canada and Australia during the early 2000s.

Present and digital conversion (late 2000s onwards) 
In the second half of the 2000s,  drive-ins had another decline because of the oil crisis and a worsening economy. Reduced use of automobiles and more people moving out of suburban and rural areas during the 2010s have also put the drive-in's future at risk, with numbers again on the decline. By 2013, drive-ins comprised only 1.5% of total movie screens in the United States, with 389 theaters in operation nationwide, mostly located in the South and the West Coast (at the industry's height, about 25% of the nation's movie screens were at drive-ins). A figure of 348 operating drive-ins was published for the United States in March 2014.

In the fall of 2014, retro-themed burger chain Johnny Rockets announced that it would team up with USA Drive-Ins to open 200 drive-ins by 2018, serving Johnny Rocket's food at the concession stands, but the plan never came to fruition, as did a proposed "Project Drive-In" scheme by Honda, which would have donated digital projectors. By 2018, less than 300 drive-in theaters were reported to operate worldwide, with only a handful outside North America.

The ongoing conversion of film distribution from celluloid to digital also puts additional pressure on drive-in theaters.  Most small drive-ins lack the finances (beginning at $70,000 per screen) needed to convert to digital projection.  The low volume of ticket sales from the lack of multiple showings also makes  justifying the cost of installing digital projection hard for many drive-ins. Conversion of the projection booth to digital is more complex for drive-in theaters. The projector needs a more powerful bulb due to increased screen size and light pollution. In addition, digital projection equipment may require an Internet connection, and the booth must be retrofitted with special glass, more vents, and stronger air conditioning, as well as heat in northern climates.

With installation of Jumbotrons or similar digital display equipment in drive-in theatres, restrictions of the projector booth can be avoided; that is, no projector is needed.

The move to digital conversion took its toll on the industry; by October 2019, figures for operating drive-in theaters rose to 305 because of increased numbers of smaller 'boutique' operations that had never used traditional projectors, while several older drive-ins have closed.

During the COVID-19 pandemic, drive-in theaters reported an unexpected surge in attendance in several U.S. states, as unlike with indoor theaters unable to operate because of bans on mass gatherings, these were allowed to operate, with such events as graduations, because people are automatically separated from each other by their cars, and usually enough space remains to walk around and still practice proper physical distancing.

The largest drive-in theater in the world, the Fort Lauderdale Swap Shop (opened 1963), doubles as the world's largest daily flea market.

Current Drive-in theater experience (since 2020) 
There is a renewed interest in drive-in theaters among North American moviegoers. This trend was more apparent in 2020 through 2022. In 2021 Drive-in theaters in North America accounted for 85 to 95 percent of the box office revenue according to CNN. The CNN article also claims that the new experience in drive-in cinemas is gaining popularity not just in North America but in other countries as well.  After decades of inactivity drive-in theaters are slowly becoming part of the outdoor movie experience. One of the countries where drive-in theaters is returning is the United Kingdom. There are also new drive-in theaters that have opened recently in North America that intend on staying in business and expanding. Some of the owners believe that the drive-in theatre will renew the outdoor experience in the long run.  Some are also projected to open in the coming years with newer designs using electronic screen system to stream the film, improving the set up, as well as concession and public facilities. In the past drive-in theaters were operating in the evening to provide clear picture. But with the new design, moviegoers can go to drive-in theaters at anytime. Just like the TV at home, the new drive-in theater does not have to depend on darkness. One of such newly designed drive-in theaters is LoCo Drive-In by Whitener Company and London Entertainment LLC. The drive-in will also be used for other social activities including car shows and other events. Another example of modern-day drive-in theater is the Drive-In Experience Ottawa that opened in 2020.  Currently, the company has two locations in the Ottawa area.  Apart from movie-nights, the drive-in also hosts live entertainment such as “comedy nights” and concerts as well events including graduations and weddings through site rental.  It provides screen, wireless in-car FM transmission and stage facilities for the events. According to the company, such a community approach will keep the drive-in experience into the future. Ottawa Business Journal also wrote that local business communities and organizations can host their own private movie nights or shows. The drive-in can also be utilized for yoga activities and fitness training.  The director of the company claims that the Drive-In Experience Ottawa’s goal is to provide opportunities for communities to reconnect while striving to host large weekly events and entertainment programs for the Ottawa residents. This new drive-in image is not just in Ottawa. According to CTV, there are also drive-ins in Ontario and other provinces that are expanding their entertainment hosting activities including live concerts while keeping the main core, i.e., to keep family movie experience. In Nova Scotia and New Brunswick, some of the drive-ins host community activities that also include religious events.

Drive-in theaters around the world

Australia 
The drive-in theater also became popular in Australia during the 1950s and 1960s. The Hoyts Skyline in Melbourne was the country's first drive-in cinema, opening in 1954 with the film On the Riviera. The drive-in was successful, and four more opened within the year, including Mainline Drive-In in Gepps Cross, South Australia, in October 2021. The number of drive-ins increased across the country in the ensuing years. As these drive-ins were based on the American trend, many served American-style food at snack bars. At the height of their popularity in the mid-1960s, around 330 drive-in theaters were operating in Australia before quickly dropping off. As of 2016, only a dozen drive-in theaters remained in Australia. Gepps Cross Drive-In is due to close at the end of February 2022, owing to various factors which have affected its viability over the years, including "the changing nature of the cinema industry, the introduction of daylight saving, film piracy and now the lengthy COVID-19 epidemic".

The world's most remote drive-in may be at Coober Pedy, South Australia. It opened in 1965, but became less popular after 1980 with the arrival of television in the town, and ceased regular operation in 1984. It was reopened in 1996, and has been operated by volunteers since 2000. It is still in operation , and the closure of the Mainline in February 2022 makes it the last drive-in theater in the state of South Australia after February 2022.

Germany
Germany's first drive-in theater, the Gravenbruch, opened in April 1960 in a suburb of Frankfurt with a screening of The King and I. The only other drive-ins in Europe at the time were in Rome, Italy and Madrid, Spain.

Greece
In 1919, Athens, Greece opened their first outdoor theater that eventually led to the popularity of drive-in theaters in the 1970s. Three years before then, two men displayed a short silent film on a wall of the city.  Greece's first drive-in theater began construction in 1960 near Varibobi, a suburb of Athens, and was planned to open in August 1961. Viewers today have the option to eat classic movie refreshments such as popcorn, or even native Greek snacks such as grilled calamari and souvlaki.

Iran 
In 2020, Iran showed its first drive-in film, Exodus, during the COVID-19 pandemic.

Italy
The first drive-in theatre in Europe opened in Rome in 1954.

Philippines 
The Philippines' shopping mall chain SM Supermalls  opened the country's first drive-in theater near SM City Pampanga on July 31, 2020. It also opened a temporary drive-in cinema at the SM Mall of Asia concert grounds on September 9, 2020.  Currently there are two locations for SM Supermalls drive-in theaters. Movies by the Bay Drive-In Cinema is located at the SM Mall of Asia, Seaside Blvd, Pasay City in the National Capital Region, Metro Manila.

See also

Effects of the car on societies
 List of drive-in theaters
 Outdoor cinema
 Inflatable movie screen

References

Further reading

External links 

 
 
 
 
 
 
 
 
 
 
 
 

Cinemas and movie theaters
Audiovisual introductions in 1932
Cultural history of the United States
Car culture
American inventions